The 1971 Kilkenny Senior Hurling Championship was the 77th staging of the Kilkenny Senior Hurling Championship since its establishment by the Kilkenny County Board.

Fenians were the defending champions.

On 14 November 1971, Bennettsbridge won the championship after a 3–10 to 1–07 defeat of Fenians in the final. It was their 12th championship title overall and their first in three championship seasons. It remains their last championship triumph.

Team changes

To Championship

Promoted from the Kilkenny Junior Hurling Championship
 Windgap

Results

First round

Windgap received a bye in this round.

Winners' group

First round

Second round

Losers' group

First round

Lisdowney received a bye in this round.

Second round

Semi-finals

Final

References

Kilkenny Senior Hurling Championship
Kilkenny Senior Hurling Championship